Akhabue Evans Ebalu, also known as Director En'man, is a Nigerian producer, cinematographer and film director. He works and directs for Carel Films where he is also the Chief Executive Officer of the company. He has directed music videos of Sinach, Ada Ehi, Rozey, Eben, Jahdiel, Testimony Jaga, and Samsong.

Biography

Early life 
He started playing musical instruments at age five and became a music producer at age twelve, beginning with tape overdub before entering into film making at age 20.

Career 
Evans is a lawyer by profession and was called to the Nigerian bar at age 21. He has founded two companies; BTSGram (Behind The Scene Gram) and Music Video Market Place. BTSGram is a film making blog that has collaborated with brands like; Feiyiu tech FY, Hollyland Technology, 3d lut creator, Teffest by Omotola Jalande-Ekeinde, Gvm LED, Insta360, Gudsenmoza, Zhiyun_tech, Filmcrux.

Filmography

Awards 
 SSMA (South-South Media Awards) 2014, Video Director of the Year (En’man – Kilq (Ileke) (Nominated & won it)
 Loveworld Awards- Nominated as Video Editor of the year in 2016 & 2017
 LMAM (Loveworld Music and Arts Ministry Awards) Category- Directing, Editing & motion graphics (2016-2019)

References 

Living people
Place of birth missing (living people)
Nigerian film producers
Nigerian cinematographers
Nigerian film directors
Year of birth missing (living people)